Kujat is the surname of:
 Galing Kujat (1983), convicted robber and a native Malaysian of Iban descent
 Harald Kujat (1942), retired German general of the Luftwaffe 
 Masir Kujat (1954), Malaysian politician

Old-Prussian-language surnames
Malaysian-language surnames
Occupational surnames